Marszałkowska (lit. Marshal Street) is one of the main thoroughfares of Warsaw's city center. It links Bank Square in its north sector with Plac Unii Lubelskiej (Union of Lublin Square) in the south.

History
Contrary to a common urban legend that attributes the name to Marshal of Poland Józef Piłsudski, the street's name actually relates to 18th-century Grand Marshal of the Crown Franciszek Bieliński.

Marszałkowska street was established by Franciszek Bieliński and opened in 1757. It was much shorter then, running only from Królewska Street to Widok Street.

The street was almost entirely destroyed during the Warsaw Uprising of 1944. Rebuilding of Warsaw after World War II coincided with emergence of socialist realism, which greatly influenced the surrounding urban architecture.

Gallery

Historical images

Features (before the war)

References

External links

 Marszałkowska in 19th century

Streets in Warsaw
Śródmieście, Warsaw